The Targa Florio Rally is a rally auto racing competition held in Sicily. It officially started in 1978 when the Targa Florio transitioned from sportcar to rally event, mostly due to safety concerns. The 71 km pattern of Circuito delle Madonie is still used in the same permutation as the original race, and as such the Targa Florio Rally is considered its official continuation. From 1984 to 2011 the Targa Florio was part of the European Rally Championship calendar of events.

Winners

Most Wins

See also
Sanremo Rally (WRC round from 1973 to 2003)
Rally d'Italia Sardegna (WRC round from 2004)
Targa Florio

References

External links

1978 establishments in Italy
Rally competitions in Italy
Sport in Sicily
Targa
Targa
Targa Florio
Recurring sporting events established in 1978